Chir (also Romanized as Chīr; also known as Chīr Bard-e Khāgak, Chīr Bard Khāyak, and Chīr-e Soflá) is a village in Dehdasht-e Gharbi Rural District, in the Central District of Kohgiluyeh County, Kohgiluyeh and Boyer-Ahmad Province, Iran. At the 2006 census, its population was 574, in 124 families.

References 

Populated places in Kohgiluyeh County